Écrins National Park is a French national park located in the southeastern part of France in the Dauphiné Alps south of Grenoble and north of Gap, shared between the departments of Isère and Hautes-Alpes. The park is one of eight regions in France designated as French National Parks.

Geography

It attracts up to 800,000 tourists annually, in particular hikers and climbers. The park has been awarded the European Diploma of Protected Areas.

Its borders mostly correspond to these of the Massif des Écrins, delimited by the main valleys of rivers Drac, Romanche and Durance (with its Guisane dependency). Écrins National Park covers the territory of the following communes: Ancelle, Aspres-lès-Corps, Bénévent-et-Charbillac, Besse-en-Oisans, Buissard, Chabottes, Champcella, Champoléon, Chantelouve, Châteauroux-les-Alpes, Chauffayer, Clavans-en-Haut-Oisans, Crots, Embrun, Entraigues, Freissinières, L'Argentière-la-Bessée, La Chapelle-en-Valgaudémar, La Grave, La Motte-en-Champsaur, Lavaldens, Le Bourg-d'Oisans, Le Monêtier-les-Bains, Le Périer, Les Costes, Les Infournas, Les Vigneaux, Mizoën, Mont-de-Lans, Orcières, Oris-en-Rattier, Ornon, Oulles, Pelvoux, Prunières, Puy-Saint-Vincent, Puy-Saint-Eusèbe, Puy-Sanières, Réallon, Réotier, Saint-Apollinaire, Saint-Bonnet-en-Champsaur, Saint-Christophe-en-Oisans, Saint-Clément-sur-Durance, Saint-Eusèbe-en-Champsaur, Saint-Firmin, Saint-Jacques-en-Valgodemard, Saint-Jean-Saint-Nicolas, Saint-Julien-en-Champsaur, Saint-Léger-les-Mélèzes, Saint-Maurice-en-Valgodemard, Saint-Michel-de-Chaillol, Savines-le-Lac, Valbonnais, Valjouffrey, Vallouise, Vénosc, Villar-d'Arêne, Villard-Notre-Dame, Villard-Reymond and Villar-Loubière.

See also
 Massif des Écrins

External links

 Ecrins National Park official site
 Ecrins pictures
 GR54 Hike in the Écrins 

National parks of France
Geography of Isère
Geography of Hautes-Alpes
Tourist attractions in Isère
Tourist attractions in Hautes-Alpes
Protected areas of the Alps